A total solar eclipse occurred on April 16, 1893. A solar eclipse occurs when the Moon passes between Earth and the Sun, thereby totally or partly obscuring the image of the Sun for a viewer on Earth. A total solar eclipse occurs when the Moon's apparent diameter is larger than the Sun's, blocking all direct sunlight, turning day into darkness. Totality occurs in a narrow path across Earth's surface, with the partial solar eclipse visible over a surrounding region thousands of kilometres wide.

Observations 
Schaeberle observed the eclipse and made drawings of the Corona:

According to Edward S. Holden, John Martin Schaeberle discovered a comet like object on the plates of the eclipse from Chile. The comet was 0.8 moondiameters from the moon.

Related eclipses

Saros 127

Tritos series

Notes

References
 NASA graphics
 Googlemap
 NASA Besselian elements
 Fotos of Solar Corona April 16, 1893
 ,,  Eclipse of April 16, 1893. Contact print from the original glass plate negative.] Lick Observatory Plate Archive, Mt. Hamilton.
 

1893 04 16
1893 in science
1893 04 16
April 1893 events